The 1937 Pittsburgh Pirates season was the team's fifth season as a professional sports club in the National Football League (NFL). The team hired John McNally as head coach after John Bach stepped down during the offseason. McNally was a former player, who played halfback for the Pirates during the 1934 season. His team finished with another 4–7 record however, McNally was welcomed back the next season.

Offseason

Draft

Regular season

Schedule

Note: Intra-division opponents are in bold text.

Game Summaries

Week 1 (Sunday September 5, 1937): Philadelphia Eagles 

at Forbes Field, Pittsburgh, Pennsylvania

 Game time: 
 Game weather: 
 Game attendance: 8,588
 Referee:

Scoring Drives:

 Pittsburgh – Brett 39 pass from Thompson (Weinstock kick)
 Philadelphia – Hanson 3 run (Smukler kick)
 Pittsburgh – Davidson 19 pass from Gildea (Niccolai kick)
 Philadelphia – Hewitt 7 pass from Smukler (Smukler kick)
 Pittsburgh – McNally 92 kick return (Breeden kick)
 Pittsburgh – McNally 44 pass from Fiske (kick failed)

Week 2 (Sunday September 19, 1937): Brooklyn Dodgers  

at Ebbets Field, Brooklyn, New York

 Game time: 
 Game weather: 
 Game attendance: 18,000
 Referee:

Scoring Drives:

 Pittsburgh – Karcis 3 run (Kakasic kick)
 Pittsburgh – Gildea 1 run (Kakasic kick)
 Pittsburgh – McNally 6 pass from Fiske (Niccolai kick)

Week 3 (Sunday September 26, 1937): New York Giants  

at Forbes Field, Pittsburgh, Pennsylvania

 Game time: 
 Game weather: 
 Game attendance: 33,095
 Referee:

Scoring Drives:

 New York – Richards 13 pass from Danowski (Manton kick)
 Pittsburgh – Karcis 4 run (Niccolai kick)
 New York – FG Manton 13

Week 4 (Monday October 4, 1937): Chicago Bears  

at Forbes Field, Pittsburgh, Pennsylvania

 Game time: 
 Game weather: 
 Game attendance: 22,511
 Referee:

Scoring Drives:

 Chicago Bears – Nolting 13 run (Manders kick)

Week 5 (Sunday October 10, 1937): Detroit Lions  

at Titan Stadium, Detroit, Michigan

 Game time: 
 Game weather: 
 Game attendance: 16,000
 Referee:

Scoring Drives:

 Pittsburgh – FG Niccolai 11
 Detroit – Caddel 2 run (Clark kick)

Week 6 (Sunday October 17, 1937): Washington Redskins  

at Griffith Stadium, Washington, DC

 Game time: 
 Game weather: 
 Game attendance: 12,835
 Referee:

Scoring Drives:

 Washington – Battles 65 interception (Smith kick)
 Pittsburgh – McNally 43 pass from Fiske (Weinstock kick)
 Pittsburgh – Thompson 55 pass from McNally (kick blocked)
 Washington – Malone 7 pass from Baugh
 Washington – Justice 3 pass from Smith (Smith kick)
 Washington – Battles 60 run (Smith kick)
 Washington – Battles 62 run (Smith kick)
 Pittsburgh – McNally 2 pass from Karcis (Niccolai kick)

Week 7 (Sunday October 24, 1937): Chicago Cardinals  

at Forbes Field, Pittsburgh, Pennsylvania

 Game time: 
 Game weather: 
 Game attendance: 8,963
 Referee:

Scoring Drives:

 Chicago Cardinals – Deskin 18 pass from Coffee (May kick)
 Chicago Cardinals – Lawrence 2 run (kick failed)
 Pittsburgh – Davidson 65 pass from Fiske (Weinstock kick)

Week 8 (Sunday October 31, 1937): Philadelphia Eagles  

at Forbes Field, Pittsburgh, Pennsylvania

 Game time: 
 Game weather: 
 Game attendance: 2,772
 Referee:

Scoring Drives:

 Philadelphia – Pilconis 22 fumble run (Smukler kick)
 Pittsburgh – Davidson 87 interception (kick failed)
 Pittsburgh – FG Niccolai 27
 Pittsburgh – Sortet 26 pass from Gildea (Niccolai kick)

Week 9 (Sunday November 7, 1937): New York Giants  

at Polo Grounds, New York, NY

 Game time: 
 Game weather: 
 Game attendance: 21,447
 Referee:

Scoring Drives:

 New York – Burnett 5 pass from Danowski (Manton kick)
 New York – FG Cuf 35
 New York – Soar 25 interception

Week 10 (Sunday November 14, 1937): Washington Redskins  

at Forbes Field, Pittsburgh, Pennsylvania

 Game time: 
 Game weather: 
 Game attendance: 12,000
 Referee:

Scoring Drives:

 Washington – Pinckert 3 pass from Smith (kick failed)
 Pittsburgh – Davidson 68 run (Weinstock kick)
 Pittsburgh – Safety, Baugh tackled in end zone by Mayhew
 Pittsburgh – FG Niccolai 21
 Washington – Justice 40 pass from Baugh (Smith kick)
 Pittsburgh – FG Niccolai 41
 Pittsburgh – Karcis 21 run (kick failed)

Week 11 (Sunday November 21, 1937): Brooklyn Dodgers  

 Game time: 
 Game weather: 
 Game attendance: 3,706
 Referee:

Scoring Drives:

 Brooklyn – Parker 2 run (Parker kick)
 Brooklyn – Parker 44 punt return (kick failed)
 Brooklyn – FG Maniaci 29
 Brooklyn – Mitchell 15 pass from Parker (Maniaci kick)

Standings

References

Pittsburgh Steelers seasons
Pittsburgh Pirates
Pittsburg Pir